Students at the University of Pennsylvania enjoy many different events at social gatherings around campus, with some sponsored by the college.

Traditions

Toast throwing

As a sign of school pride, crowds of Quaker fans perform a unique ritual. After the third quarter of football games, spirited onlookers unite in the singing of "Drink a Highball," which refers to the University's unofficial cocktail, the Pennsylvanian, made with Calvados, a dash of Madeira Wine, an egg white, and a twist of lemon. In years long past, students would literally make a toast with the drink to the success of Penn's athletic teams. During Prohibition, stubborn students insisted on keeping their tradition - since they could not use alcohol, they had no choice but to literally "toast" Penn. As the last line, "Here's a toast to dear old Penn," is sung, the fans send toast hurling through the air onto the sidelines. In another version of the origins of toast throwing, in 1977, a student threw the first slice of toast after being inspired while attending a showing of The Rocky Horror Picture Show where members of the audience throw toast at the screen.  In more recent years, some students have become more creative in their choice of projectiles, and it is not rare to see a hail of bagels or donuts, or even a loaf of French bread come flying down from the stands.

The athletics department has purchased several industrial street sweepers built by Tenant Inc. The latest is a 6400 Rider Sweeper used for cleaning the concourses and track area of the stadium. The sweeper is often called the "toast Zamboni".

Econ Scream
At midnight on the eve of the first Microeconomics 001 midterm exam, hundreds of students (predominantly freshmen) try to release stress by participating in a collective shout on the Junior Balcony of the Lower Quadrangle. Streakers often run around on the grassy area of the lower quad. This tradition has been upheld by the Freshman Class Board, a branch of Penn's student government, as their inaugural Board event every year.

Goal post tossing
In past years, the Penn Quakers have won the Ivy League championship, sending the jubilant fans into a frenzy. In celebration, the fans ripped down the goal posts and tossed them into the Schuylkill River.  This tradition has most likely ended, as the last attempt to tear down the goalposts failed in 2003 as a result of a concrete footing that made efforts to topple them futile. In 2009, students did not attempt to tear down the goal posts, as Penn police officers had made a blockade around them using their bicycles.

U-Night

Started with the Class of 2021, U-Night is the final addition to the Penn traditions experience. The event is one of the four times, along with Convocation, Hey Day, and Graduation, where all the students of the Sophomore class will be together in the same place.

Hey Day

In April, several class traditions are celebrated. Class Day, which began in 1865 to supplement the final graduation exercises, celebrates the progression of all classes and the departure of the seniors. In 1916, this day merged with Straw Hat Day and became the "day of two events." In 1931, Hey Day arose from these two celebrations. On this day, the juniors gather on High Rise Field for a picnic, don straw "skimmers" and canes, and march triumphantly down Locust Walk to College Hall.

The procession tradition began in 1949. More recently, the straw skimmers have changed to styrofoam hats, and classmates take bites out of one another's hats. When the procession reaches College Hall, the students make an arch with their canes to greet the President of the University. The outgoing and incoming senior class presidents then give speeches, and the juniors are "officially" declared seniors. In May 2015, the university commemorated the celebration of the 100th Hey Day.

Ivy Day
One plants ivy by a building, and an "Ivy Stone" is placed on the building to commemorate the occasion. In 1981, the day was officially moved to the Saturday before Commencement. Also on this day, the Spoon, Bowl, Cane, and Spade awards, honoring four graduating men and the Hottel, Harnwell, Goddard, and Brownlee awards, honoring four graduating women, are presented. During the celebration, a noted individual who is chosen by the class gives an address. Recent Ivy Day addresses have been presented by Penn Parent Joan Rivers, former Philadelphia Mayor and Governor of Pennsylvania (and also a Penn alumnus) Ed Rendell, and basketball player Julius Erving.

The building receiving the Ivy Stone is very often a building of some significance to the graduating class.  For example, in 1983, a stone was placed near the field in Franklin Field celebrating Penn's first Ivy League championship in football since 1959 the previous fall—at the yard line from which the game-winning field goal against Harvard was kicked, clinching at least a share of the championship.

The Red and Blue
Penn students have a school anthem, "The Red and Blue". This is not to be confused with the official alma mater of the university, "Hail, Pennsylvania!".

Spring Fling
Spring Fling is an annual festival for the students at the end of each Spring semester, usually beginning on the Friday of the second to last week of the semester and continuing until Saturday night. Fling, which began in 1973, is dubbed the largest college party on the East Coast, and is hosted by the university's Social Planning and Events Committee. The event takes place on College Green, Wynn Commons, and The Quadrangle (or Quad) for a student body drenched in alcohol, for the most part. Over the past few years there has been legitimate discussion towards potentially moving the event out of the Quad, but improved behavior has resulted in the carnival aspect of the festival remaining in the Quad.  College Green becomes a staging area for carnival games and carnival food. Two stages in the Quad host Penn's performing arts groups.  Saturday night, Penn holds a festival on College Green, and Friday night SPEC (The Social Planning and Events Committee SPEC – Bringing events to Penn since 1989) brings in a headlining musical act for a concert.  Past guests for this concert have included Wyclef Jean, Busta Rhymes, Sonic Youth, and Of A Revolution.  The 2007 concert featured Ben Folds and Third Eye Blind. The 2008 concert was moved to Franklin Field since it featured a triple-bill of Ludacris, Gym Class Heroes, and OK Go.  Learning from the 2008 concert, 2009's concert featuring Guster and Akon ran much more smoothly. The 2010 line up was Kid Cudi, Shwayze and Snoop Dogg. The 2011 Fling performers were Ratatat, Flo Rida, and Lupe Fiasco. The 2012 Fling performers were Tiësto and Passion Pit.
 The 2013 performers were Janelle Monáe, Tyga, and Girl Talk (musician). In 2014, the artists were Magic Man (band), Ra Ra Riot, and David Guetta.

Feb Club
Feb Club (originally a Yale tradition) is a tradition in which the members of the senior class attend a party or other special event every day for the entire month of February. Those with a perfect record of attendance have their name inscribed onto a Plaque in Smokey Joes Bar.

Walnut Walk
Taking advantage of Penn's location in the city of Philadelphia, members of the senior class don Walnut Walk themed shirts and embark on a day-long, citywide pub crawl, starting at 2nd Street near the waterfront and moving westward along Walnut Street until participants arrive at Smokey Joe's on 40th Street, just south of Walnut. The event is one of the highlights of "Senior Week," in which seniors celebrate the end of their time at Penn.

Rowbottoms

"Hey—Rowbottom!" or "Yea Rowbottom!" was a common cry on the West Philadelphia campus from about 1910 until the 1970s. Once a "Rowbottom" got underway, automobiles might be overturned, windows smashed, and trolley tracks doused with gasoline and set ablaze. In the 1940s "panty raids" of the women's dormitories became a prominent feature. Rowbottoms were most frequent in the fall, particularly after football games.

Fraternity and sorority chapters

Interfraternity Council Chapters

Alpha Chi Rho
Alpha Epsilon Pi 
Alpha Sigma Phi 
Alpha Tau Omega
Beta Theta Pi
Delta Kappa Epsilon
Delta Phi (St. Elmo)
Delta Psi (St. Anthony)
Delta Tau Delta
Delta Upsilon
Kappa Alpha Society

Kappa Sigma
Lambda Chi Alpha
Phi Delta Theta
Phi Gamma Delta (Fiji)
Phi Kappa Psi
Phi Sigma Kappa
Pi Kappa Alpha
Pi Kappa Phi
Pi Lambda Phi
Psi Upsilon

Sigma Alpha Epsilon
Sigma Alpha Mu
Sigma Chi
Sigma Nu
Sigma Phi Epsilon
Sigma Pi
Tau Epsilon Phi
Theta Tau
Theta Xi
Zeta Beta Tau
Zeta Psi

Panhellenic Council Chapters

Alpha Delta Pi
Alpha Phi
Chi Omega
Delta Delta Delta

Kappa Alpha Theta
Sigma Delta Tau
Sigma Kappa
Zeta Tau Alpha

Multicultural Greek Council Chapters

Alpha Kappa Alpha
alpha Kappa Delta Phi
Alpha Phi Alpha
Delta Sigma Theta
Lambda Phi Epsilon
Lambda Theta Alpha
Lambda Upsilon Lambda

Kappa Alpha Psi
Omega Psi Phi
Sigma Beta Rho
Sigma Lambda Upsilon
Sigma Psi Zeta
Zeta Phi Beta

Clubs and student groups
Performing arts groups include The University of Pennsylvania Band, one of the oldest scramble bands in the country; there are also numerous student-run theatre groups, including unique groups like the long-running Pennsylvania Players, Penn Singers Light Opera Company, iNtuitons Experimental Theatre, Front Row Theatre Company, and Quadramics Theatre Company. Penn also has a strong dance community including groups like Penn Dance, Arts House Dance Company, Quaker Girls, Sparks, DH2, Onda Latina, West Philly Swingers, Strictly Funk, HYPE, Yalla, Pan-Asian, Dhamaka, PENNaach, Penn Masti, African Rhythms, and Soundworks Tap Factory. Singing groups include the a cappella jazz (Counterparts); the traditional PennSix; Pennchants; Off the Beat; Penn Masala—a Hindi group which has received global acclaim, PennYo, a co-ed Chinese group; Penn Atma, an all-female south-asian fusion group; The University of Pennsylvania Glee Club, its small group, the Penn Pipers, founded in 1862, one of the oldest continually-performing collegiate performance groups in the United States; and the Penn Sirens, an all-female vocal ensemble. Punch Bowl Humor Magazine is the oldest student-run magazine on campus, and is also the only humor magazine at Penn. Mask and Wig, founded in 1889, is the oldest all-male collegiate musical comedy troupe in the nation. Penn is also home to Bloomers, the nation's first collegiate all-female musical sketch comedy troupe. Penn has a substantial Fraternity and Sorority presence on campus.  Penn Jazz, the university's only big-band jazz ensemble, has been playing on campus for over twenty years and has performed with Dizzy Gillespie, Branford Marsalis, and other jazz icons. The Penn International Affairs Association is one of the largest student groups, hosting a variety of on-campus academic events and is host to a world-renowned Model United Nations team.

International Affairs Association
The International Affairs Association (IAA) is the largest self funded student organization at the University of Pennsylvania, with the goal of promoting awareness of International Affairs.  The club, founded 45 years ago is composed as several semi-independent but centrally funded programs, which each promote awareness of international relations in different ways. It currently hosts two internationally attended and -recognized Model United Nations conferences, the college-level University of Pennsylvania Model United Nations Conference (UPMUNC) in the fall and the high school-level Ivy League Model United Nations Conference (ILMUNC), in the spring. The IAA's Intercollegiate Model United Nations Team has established itself as one of the best in the nation, taking the number one ranking spot in the 2016-2017 season. The IAA's internal publication, “The Ambassador,” published six times a year, keeps the club members informed.

Penn Singers
The Penn Singers is a light opera company at the University of Pennsylvania.  The group was founded in 1957 as the University's first all-female choir and was converted into a co-ed light opera company in 1972.  The group performs two major productions each year - a Broadway-style musical or revue in the fall, and a Gilbert and Sullivan operetta or a show of similar quality in the spring.

Pennsylvania Players
Founded in 1936, the Pennsylvania Players was the first student theatre group at the University of Pennsylvania. With the guidance of professional directors, Penn Players produces two major shows each year, a musical in the fall and a straight play in the spring, in the Harold Prince Theater of the Annenberg Center.

Selected Penn publications
 34th Street Magazine – weekly arts and culture magazine
 Almanac - Official publication of record, opinion and news at the University of Pennsylvania
 CUREJ - College Undergraduate Research Electronic Journal
 The Daily Pennsylvanian - Penn's independent, student-run newspaper; published since 1885; regularly wins Pacemaker and CSPA Gold Circle awards
 First Call Magazine - Penn's undergraduate magazine
 Knowledge@Wharton - online business journal of the Wharton School
 Penn Asian Review - journal related to all regions of Asia
 Penn History Review - undergraduate history journal
 Penn Triangle - science and technology magazine founded in 1899; oldest of Penn's student-run journals; a student-run SEAS publication
 Pen Undergraduate Law Journal - student-run undergraduate law journal
 PennScience - undergraduate science research journal
 Phillybuster - Official publication of the University of Pennsylvania class of 2017
 SPICE: Student Perspectives on Institutions, Choices & Ethics - undergraduate journal of Philosophy, Politics, and Economics
 Pennsylvania Punch Bowl - Penn's humor magazine, founded in 1889; one of the nation's oldest and most acclaimed humor magazines
 PoliComm - journal of political communication
 Res - undergraduate journal of research writing
 Penn Political Review - Penn's primary outlet for student sociopolitical thought
 Penn Bioethics Journal - journal of bioethics
 Sound Politicks - Penn's academic journal of political science
 Under The Button - online blog for student news, gossip and entertainment 
 The WALK - fashion magazine with once a semester print publications, daily updated website at www.thewalkmagazine.com

Religious life
Unlike many of its Ivy peers, Penn was not founded with the intention of preparing men for ministerial vocations, nor was the university affiliated with any one particular religious body. Franklin envisioned an institution that would provide students with a liberal arts education: not devoid of religion, but including religion as one among many fields of study.

As a result, Penn has no central area for religious worship; although, it does maintain adequate resources for religious students.  Until the 2010-2011 school year, Penn did not provide direct funding for religious student groups.  Due to a large demand for religious groups an $8,000 "Faith Fund" was created for distribution by the Office of the Chaplain.  The office hosts three staff members including the University Chaplain and Associate Chaplain, in addition to an Interfaith Fellow. Penn recognizes more than 40 religiously affiliated student groups and another 40 campus ministries and local congregations connected to campus life, although without monetary support. PRISM (Programs in Religious, Interfaith, and Spirituality Matters) serves as the representative of all undergraduate faith organizations to the university and facilitates interfaith dialogue, cooperation, and events. PRISM has led the MAJIC trip to New Orleans over Spring Break two of the past three years.

Large campus religious groups include Hillel for Jewish students, Newman Center for Catholics, Muslim Students Association (MSA), Hindu Student Council/Young Jains of America (HSC/YJA), Penn Sikh Organization (PSO), Penn Students for Christ (PSC), Intervarsity Christian Fellowship (PennIV), the Christian Association (CA), the World Peace Buddhists @ Penn (WPB@P), Grace Covenant Church, and the Ronald O Perelman center for Jewish Life at Chabad Lubavitch House at Penn.

The Newman Center is the oldest Newman campus ministry in the country dating back to 1893, and owns its own complex one block from campus. Penn Hillel's Steinhardt Hall is the largest Hillel International building of any college or university in the country. The Christian Association has produced notable ministers and scholars including Harvey Cox. Some of the other campus religious groups work out of the Religious Activity Commons (RAC) on Locust Walk.

Penn has Religious Studies and Judaic Studies departments. Notable professors include John DiIulio of Penn's Political Science Department, the first Director of the White House Office of Faith-Based and Community Initiatives. The CHORDS initiative, led jointly by the Associate Chaplain and a student board, organize service efforts with faith-based groups in the West Philadelphia community.

References

Student
Pennsylvania, University of
Pennsylvania, University of
Student culture in the United States